is a former Japanese football player.

Playing career
Nagata was born in Chiba Prefecture on April 13, 1972. After graduating from Meiji University, he joined Japan Football League club Kyoto Purple Sanga in 1995. He played many matches as substitute forward from first season. The club was promoted to J1 League from 1996. He retired end of 1997 season.

Club statistics

References

External links

sports.geocities.jp

1972 births
Living people
Meiji University alumni
Association football people from Chiba Prefecture
Japanese footballers
J1 League players
Japan Football League (1992–1998) players
Kyoto Sanga FC players
Association football forwards